Ballynure is a village and civil parish near Ballyclare in County Antrim, Northern Ireland. It is part of Antrim and Newtownabbey Borough Council and had a population of 677 people in the 2001 Census.

Transport
 Ballynure was formerly served by the Ballymena and Larne Railway, a narrow gauge railway. Ballynure railway station opened on 24 August 1878, but finally closed on 1 October 1930.

Sport
Ballynure Old Boys F.C. plays association football in the Ballymena & Provincial League.

2002 Census 
Ballynure is classified as a massive village or hamlet by the NI Statistics and Research Agency (NISRA) (i.e. with a population between 500 and 10,000 people). On Census day (29 April 2002) there were 677 people living in Ballynure. Of these:
 22.3% were aged under 16 and 15.8% were aged 60 and over
 48.2% of the population were male and 51.9% were female
 0.1% were from a Catholic background and 99.9% were from a Protestant background
 0.4% of people aged 16–74 were unemployed.

Places of interest

The Ballynure Elementary School for Primary Education (often known simply as Ballynure Primary School) is only school in the village and surrounding areas until Ballyclare. It is also one of six schools in Northern Ireland classed as "Elementary Schools". The School was founded in 1930.

The Ballynure Cemetery is the oldest cemetery in all Newtownabbey and second oldest in all Antrim.

Additional information

Jonathan Swift, the writer of Gulliver's Travels, was responsible for the Ballynure parish of the Church of Ireland, during his time as prebend of Kilroot.

The Clements family, who lived at Clements Hill outside the village, were the ancestors of Samuel Langhorne Clemens, better known as Mark Twain. Twain, who was author of works including The Adventures of Tom Sawyer, was described by William Faulkner as 'the father of American literature.' His grandfather Samuel Clemens emigrated to America and Twain was born in Florida, Missouri, in November 1835. One of his ancestors, Henry Clements, was Mayor of Carrickfergus in 1696 and another is said to have fought for William of Orange at the Battle of the Boyne six years earlier.

In 2007, Ballynure started a fair, which is now known as the "Yearly Ballynure fair".  Along with the May Fair in Ballyclare, this fair is one of the very few yearly fairs in the U.K. where animals can be bought, although unlike the May Fair (which sells horses) the Ballynure Fair has only been known to sell cows.

In 2017, the village established "Ballynature Day", currently the largest nature convention in Northern Ireland.

Notable people
 Alexander Macomb, American merchant, born in Ballynure
 James Whiteside McCay (1864–1930), Australian general during WWI, born in Ballynure
 Jonathan Rea, five-time World Superbike champion; won his titles consecutively in 2015, 2016, 2017, 2018 and 2019, making him the most successful World SBK rider in the competition's history. He also holds the highest number of race wins in the championship.
 Paddy McNair, a professional footballer with Middlesbrough FC and the Northern Ireland national football team

See also
List of civil parishes in County Antrim

References

Sources
 NI Statistics and Research Agency (NISRA)
 Culture Northern Ireland

External links 
 The Village website

Villages in County Antrim
Civil parishes of County Antrim